The International University Bowl is a collegiate American football bowl game  that is played annually at Estadio Olímpico Universitario in Mexico City since 2016.

Game results

References

External links
 Official Europe Warriors site

American football in Mexico
Recurring sporting events established in 2016
2016 establishments in Mexico